The 1994 Arkansas gubernatorial election took place on November 8, 1994, as a part of the United States gubernatorial elections, 1994.

Democratic nomination
Incumbent Democratic Governor Jim Guy Tucker assumed the office after his predecessor, Bill Clinton, resigned in December 1992, after being elected President of the United States. Tucker decided to run for a full term. However, less than two years later, Tucker was forced to resign from the governorship due to his involvement in the Whitewater Scandal.

Republican nomination
Candidates
 State Senator Steve Luelf
 Businessman Sheffield Nelson
William L. Jones

Primary results (May 17):
 Nelson – 24,054 (50.80%)
 Luelf – 20,953 (44.25%)
 Jones – 2,346 (4.95%)

General election
Although the Republican Party made impressive gains in 1994 Republican Revolution, winning a majority in the United States Senate, United States House of Representatives, as well as a majority of governorships, Tucker ran as a moderate Democrat and won in a landslide.

 Jim Guy Tucker (D) (inc.) – 428,936 (59.84%)
 Sheffield Nelson (R) – 287,904 (40.16%)

References

1994
Gubernatorial
Arkansas